Dorcadion daratshitshagi is a species of beetle in the family Cerambycidae. It was described by Suvorov in 1915. It is known from Armenia.

References

daratshitshagi
Beetles described in 1915